Ignaz Ritter von Rudhart  (11 March 1790 in Weismain, Upper Franconia – 11 May 1838) was a Bavarian scholar and public servant who was dispatched to Greece to serve as President of the Privy Council (Prime Minister) during the reign of King Otto.

Von Rudhart had received a doctorate of law from the University of Munich, had authored two books, one of them a statistical survey of the Bavarian Kingdom, which he served as a member of the Council of State, prior to his appointment as Prime Minister of Greece.

When he arrived in Athens in February 1837, he was received suspiciously by the English legate Lyons (who had been a supporter of his predecessor, von Armansperg) and immediately found himself at also odds with the king over the role of the prime minister. King Otto was committed to an absolute monarchy and was resistant to a powerful chief minister. Von Rudhart had a series of clashes with king, and being disliked by Queen Amalia, his resignation was accepted by King Otto 10 months after he arrived in Greece. Otto served as his own President of the Privy Council until a constitution was forced on him during the 3 September 1843 Revolution.

References
 John A. Petropulos; Politics and Statecraft in the Kingdom of Greece; Princeton University Press, 1968

1790 births
1838 deaths
19th-century prime ministers of Greece
People from Lichtenfels (district)
Naturalized citizens of Greece
Prime Ministers of Greece
History of Greece (1832–1862)
Members of the Bavarian Chamber of Deputies